Highdeal, a privately owned BSS software product company, was founded in  in the R&D labs of France Télécom by a team including Eric Pillevesse and Serge Soudoplatoff, and officially spun off in the year 2000. Highdeal's flagship product, Highdeal Transactive, is a modular software suite. Highdeal was acquired by SAP in June 2009. The company's headquarters are in New York City and Paris, France with numerous satellite offices throughout the world.

Currently, Highdeal has over 180 implementations in more than 50 countries with customers spanning all industries that need to adapt to the NGN environment such as finance, transportation and logistics, new media and publishing, mobile/wireless, broadband, and on-demand services.

Highdeal Transactive Features
Highdeal Transactive Features include:
Pricing & Rating Capabilities
Real-Time Account Balance Management
Automated Partner Settlement
Billing, Customer Care & Accounts Receivable
Profit Simulation & Pricing Analytics
Connector Framework & Open APIs

See also
 Telecommunications rating
 Operational Support Systems

References
 
 
 
 http://www.komputerwfirmie.pl/itbiznes/1,54787,4336998.html
 https://web.archive.org/web/20071012144746/http://www.mobileeurope.co.uk/features/113115/Policy_management_needed_for_standards_soup.html
 http://www.ossobserver.com/reports/details.cfm?pageID=4&reportID=237
 https://web.archive.org/web/20071119192833/http://www.mobileeurope.co.uk/features/113020/Size_matters.html
 https://web.archive.org/web/20080906092848/http://www.eurocomms.com/features/111810/TMW_REVIEW_-_Glittering_prizes.html
 
 
 http://www.telecommagazine.com/Americas/article.asp?HH_ID=AR_3053
 http://www.tmcnet.com/ims/0407/ims-feature-article-cut-to-the-chase-making-money.htm
 
 
 
 
 http://www.xchangemag.com/tdhotnews/65h3132655.html
 
 http://www.sipcenter.com/sip.nsf/newsview?open&type=News&docid=WEBB69TN7A

External links
 Hoovers Company Overview

Companies established in 1996
Business software companies